ITL International Journal of Applied Linguistics is an peer-reviewed academic journal of linguistics. It is published by the Department of Linguistics (KU Leuven), the Department of Applied Linguistics (Vlekho), and the Department of Applied Linguistics (Lessius Hogeschool) and is hosted online by Peeters Publishers. The journal has merged with Interface, Journal of Applied Linguistics, published by the Department of Applied Linguistics (VLEKHO).

'ITL' refers to Instituut voor Toegepaste Linguïstiek, the center of applied linguistics at KU Leuven, where the journal was founded.

Abstracting and indexing 
The journal is indexed and abstracted in the following bibliographic databases:

The journal is also evaluated in CARHUS Plus+, ERIH PLUS, and SCImago.

See also
List of applied linguistics journals

References

External links
@Peeters
@John Benjamins
Publisher's website

Linguistics journals
Applied linguistics
Peeters Publishers academic journals
Biannual journals
John Benjamins academic journals